Gordon King is the name of:

 Gordon King (gynaecologist) (1900–1991), English gynaecologist
 Gordon Grimsley King (1918–2009), Australian Army officer
 Gordon King (American football) (born 1956), American football player